Radoszyce  (Radoshytsi) village in East Małopolska, the southeastern part of  Poland in Bieszczady mountains. Situated in the Subcarpathian Voivodship (since 1999), previously in Krosno Voivodeship (1975–1998) and Sanok district, Komańcza subdistrict, located near the towns of Medzilaborce and Palota (in northeastern Slovakia).

It is situated below the main watershed at the foot of the Radoszyce Mountain Pass, and has an elevation of 570 metres. It is the oldest settlement in the Osławica river-basin, in the Roman era trade route that passed through this area.

In the centre of the village there is a wooden Greek-Catholic church of Saint Demitrius dating 1868 which now serves as the Roman Catholic Church. The wooden church was renovated in 1899. A filial church is located in Osławica, 3 km away. Inside the church there is an original iconostas and Rococo altar from the 18th century.  Above the village there is a chapel by a stream with a "miraculous spring". Inside the chapel there is an interesting, contemporary icon of Christ in Gethsemane. In 1785 the village lands comprised 25.6 sq². There were inhabited by about 830 (1785). In 1936 there were about 1100 persons.

 Time zone : UTC+1/SummerUTC+2

References

Villages in Sanok County